The 1849 United States Senate election in Pennsylvania was held on January 10, 1849. James Cooper was elected by the Pennsylvania General Assembly to the United States Senate.

Results
Incumbent Democrat Simon Cameron, who was elected in 1845, was not a candidate for re-election to another term. The Pennsylvania General Assembly, consisting of the House of Representatives and the Senate, convened on January 10, 1849, to elect a new Senator to fill the term beginning on March 4, 1849. Three ballots were recorded. The results of the third and final ballot of both houses combined are as follows:

{{Election box winning candidate with party link no change|
  |party = Whig Party (United States)
  |candidate = James Cooper  |votes = 66
  |percentage = 49.62
  |change = 
}}

|-
|-bgcolor="#EEEEEE"
| colspan="3" align="right" | Totals| align="right" | 133| align="right" | 100.00%'''
|}

See also 
 United States Senate elections, 1848 and 1849

References

External links
Pennsylvania Election Statistics: 1682-2006 from the Wilkes University Election Statistics Project

1849
Pennsylvania
United States Senate